Timballo is an Italian baked dish consisting of pasta, rice, or potatoes, with one or more other ingredients (cheese, meat, fish, vegetables, or fruit) included. Variations include the mushroom and shrimp sauce Timballo Alberoni, named after Giulio Alberoni; and the veal and tomato sauce Timballo Pattadese.

Etymology
The name comes from the French word for kettledrum (timbale). Varieties of Timballo differ from region to region, and it is sometimes known as a bomba, tortino, sartù (a type of Neapolitan timballo with rice and tomato sauce) or pasticcio (which is used more commonly to refer to a similar dish baked in a pastry crust). It is also known as timpano and timbale. It is similar to a casserole and is sometimes referred to in English as a pie or savory cake.

Preparation

The dish is prepared in a dome or springform pan and eggs or cheese are used as a binder.  Rice is commonly used as an ingredient in Emilia-Romagna, where the dish is referred to as a bomba and baked with a filling of pigeon or other game bird, peas, local cheese and a base of dried pasta. Crêpes are used as a base in Abruzzo, and other regions use ravioli or gnocchi. In Sicily, it is typically made with pasta and eggplant.

Mushroom sauce or fonduta, a rich Piedmontese cheese soup and sauce, are sometimes used, and Anna Del Conte wrote that Béchamel is the most consistently used ingredient in timballos.

In popular culture
Timballo featured prominently in the 1996 film Big Night, although the dish there is referred to as timpano (a regional or family term).

"Timpano" was featured in the American Dad episode S18 E1.

See also

 Baked ziti
 Lasagna
 List of casserole dishes
 List of pasta dishes
 Quiche
 Pastitsio

References

External links
 Timballo Siciliano recipe

Italian cuisine
Casserole dishes
Pasta dishes